Sainte-Justine may refer to:

Centre hospitalier universitaire Sainte-Justine, a Montreal hospital.
Sainte-Justine, a municipality in Quebec
Sainte-Justine-de-Newton, a municipality in Quebec